Persicoptera compsopa is a moth of the family Pyralidae described by Edward Meyrick in 1887. It is found in Australia.

References

Pyralinae
Moths of Australia
Moths described in 1887
Taxa named by Edward Meyrick